Unsane is the debut album by Unsane, released in 1991 through Matador Records. It is the only studio album by the group to feature founding member Charlie Ondras, who died of a heroin overdose during the 1992 New Music Seminar in New York during the tour supporting the album. The album's cover art, depicting a decapitated corpse on subway tracks, was given to the band from a friend who worked on the investigation for the case.

Death metal band Entombed covered "Vandal-X" on their self-titled compilation album in 1997.

Reception

Patrick Kennedy from AllMusic called it a brilliant and daring debut that "assaults the senses like the Swans or Foetus before them, but tempers that art-scum priggishness with clear roots in punk and classic rock."

Track listing

Personnel

Unsane
Charlie Ondras – drums, lead vocals on "AZA-2000" and "Action Man"
Pete Shore – bass guitar, backing vocals
Chris Spencer – lead vocals, guitar

Additional musicians and production
Simon Bodger – photography
Wharton Tiers – production, engineering
Unsane – production

References

Unsane albums
1991 debut albums
Albums produced by Wharton Tiers
Matador Records albums